Slatinski Dol is a dispersed settlement in the western Slovene Hills north and west of Zgornja Kungota in the Municipality of Kungota in northeastern Slovenia.

References

External links
Slatinski Dol on Geopedia

Populated places in the Municipality of Kungota